Saint Faustinus may refer to:

2nd-century martyr (see Faustinus and Jovita)
Faustinus of Brescia, 4th century
Simplicius, Faustinus and Beatrix, 4th century